Chauché is a commune of the Vendée department in the Pays de la Loire region in western France.

See also
Communes of the Vendée department

References

External links

 https://web.archive.org/web/20110717104029/http://www.tripsay.com/destination/Chauch%C3%A9

Communes of Vendée